Mahendravarman (vraḥ kamrateṅ añ Śrī Mahendravarmma in Pre-Angkorian ; also titled Citrasena) was also called Protégé of the Great Indra.

Biography 
Mahendravarman was a king of the kingdom of Chenla, modern day Cambodia, during the 6th century. Chenla was the direct predecessor of the Khmer empire. Citrasena was a close relative of Bhavavarman I, whom he joined to conquer the Kingdom of Funan, and whom he succeeded as king and adopting the name Mahendravarman. After Bhavavarman's death, Mahendravarman took residence in the capital at Sambor Prei Kuk while the same time Hiraṇyavarman was ruling Cambodia.

Mahendravarman sent an ambassador to Champa to "ensure friendship between the two countries."

After the death of Mahendravarman, his son Īśānavarman (Pre-Angkorian ) had taken the control of the kingdom, where his father ruled for several years. He ruled the kingdom until 628.

Sons of Īśānavarman
 Śivadatta , mod. 
 Īsvarakumāra , mod. 
 Yuvarāja ) (Crown Prince) - Name not identified from historical records

References

 Coedes, G. (1962). "The Making of South-east Asia." London: Cox & Wyman Ltd.

External links
 Google Books

6th-century Cambodian monarchs
Cambodian Hindus
Hindu monarchs
611 deaths
Year of birth unknown
7th-century Cambodian monarchs
Chenla